The 1946 Missouri Valley Vikings football team was an American football team that represented Missouri Valley College as a member of the Missouri College Athletic Union (MCAU) during the 1946 college football season. In their seventh season under head coach Volney Ashford, the Vikings compiled a perfect 10–0 record (4–0 against MCAU teams), won the MCAU championship, shut out five of ten opponents, and outscored all opponents by a total of 387 to 33.

The season was part of a 41-game winning streak (1941–1942, 1946–1948) that still ranks as the fifth longest in college football history. Coach Ashford, who led the team during the streak, was later inducted into the College Football Hall of Fame.

Missouri Valley halfback Alva Baker ranked seventh nationally in scoring among small-college players with 84 points scored. Eleven Missouri Valley players received honors from the Associated Press (AP) on the All-MCAU football team, six on the first team and five on the second team. The honorees included Alva Baker at halfback (AP-1); Ted Chittwood at end (AP-1); Jim Nelson (AP-1) and Verlie Harris (AP-1) at the guard position; Bill Klein at center (AP-2). 

Missouri Valley's roster also included back Hugh C. Dunn, who lost his left hand due to injuries suffered in a German mortar attack during World War II.

During the fall of 1946, Missouri Valley College had only 513 students, 322 of which were freshmen.

Schedule

Notes

References

Missouri Valley
Missouri Valley Vikings football seasons
College football undefeated seasons
Missouri Valley Vikings football